This is a list of lighthouses and lightvessels in Denmark. Except for the island of Bornholm, Denmark is located at the transition between North Sea and Baltic Sea which includes the Skagerrak and Kattegat waters.

Lighthouses

See also 
 List of lighthouses in the Faroe Islands
 Lists of lighthouses and lightvessels

References

External links 

 Leuchtturm net's collection of photographs of Danish lighthouses and lightvessels
 

Architecture in Denmark
Denmark transport-related lists

Lists of buildings and structures in Denmark
Denmark
Lightships